The 2015 Sefton Metropolitan Borough Council election took place on 7 May 2015 to elect members of Sefton Metropolitan Borough Council in England. This was on the same day as other local elections. Sefton Metropolitan Borough Council in England, as part of the 2015 United Kingdom local elections. 22 seats, representing one third of the total Council membership, were up for election in single-member wards.

Ward results

References

2015 English local elections
May 2015 events in the United Kingdom
2015
2010s in Merseyside